The Spanish Indies may refer to the following:

 The Spanish West Indies (1492–1898) Colony of Spain that covered most of the Caribbean
 The Spanish East Indies (1565–1901) The overseas territories of the Spanish Empire that covered the Philippine Islands and other parts of the East Indies